Enzo Girolami Castellari (born 29 July 1938) is an Italian director, screenwriter and actor.

Life and career

Early life
Castellari was born in Rome into a family of filmmakers. His father was a boxer turned film maker Marino Girolami. His uncle is filmmaker Romolo Guerrieri and his brother was actor Ennio Girolami. He initially was a boxer like his father and went to school to get a degree in architecture.

Film career
Castellari began work on film assisting with various jobs on sets of his father's films. Among his early credits included uncredited roles in directing films such as Few Dollars for Django (1966) and A Ghentar si muore facile (1967). Many of Castellari's early works are Spaghetti Westerns. He received his official credited directorial debut with Renegade Riders (1967), a film shot in Spain and influenced by Sidney J. Furie's film The Appaloosa (1966). After releasing the Western Kill Them All and Come Back Alone (1968), Castellari did a Macaroni war film titled Eagles Over London.

By the early 1970s, Castellari began exploring other genres as well such as the thriller Cold Eyes of Fear (1971), the comedy Hector the Mighty (1972), and the comedic swashbuckler The Loves and Times of Scaramouche (1976). He directed his first poliziotteschi film with High Crime starring Franco Nero. Nero and Castellari formed a relationship with the film and work together for seven features.

Castellari later noted his work with Nero, stating "I think that to have an actor like Franco Nero is one of the best things that can happen to a director...if it had been possible, I would have made all my films with him" Nero would work with Castellari on the Western Keoma which was only a mild success in Italy on its release, but would later be praised as one of Castellari's best films. Castellari created further poliziotteschi films in the late 1970s as well as the war film The Inglorious Bastards. Castellari was offered to direct the film Zombi 2, but turned it down as he didn't feel he would be the right director for a horror film.

In the 1980s the popularity of the poliziotteschi faltered and Castellari's film Day of the Cobra with Franco Nero was not popular in the box office. Castellari followed it up with The Last Shark, a film about a small beach town terrorized by a bloodthirsty great white shark. The film was withdrawn from theaters after Universal Studios sued the production for being too similar to the film Jaws. Castellari next film 1990: The Bronx Warriors was a surprise hit that created a small wave of films from Italy inspired by the John Carpenter film Escape from New York. The mid-to-late 1980s work for Castellari was work made for foreign markets such as Light Blast (1985), Striker and Sinbad of the Seven Seas.

In the 1990s, Castellari's work was mostly dedicated to made-for-television productions. Castellari made a comeback film in 2010 with Caribbean Basterds, a film which received a theatrical release in Italy which was a rarity for locally made genre films at the time. Castellari cameoed as a German mortar squad commander in The Inglorious Bastards, and Quentin Tarantino cast Castellari in the cameo role of a German general in his film Inglourious Basterds (2009), which was inspired by Castellari's 1978 film.

In October 2014 Castellari was awarded at the Almería Western Film Festival.

Filmography

References

Bibliography

External links
 
 Enzo G.Castellari-biography on (re)Search my Trash
Castellari: Action Italian Style tribute publication dedicated to Enzo G. Castellari and his films

1938 births
German-language film directors
Living people
Film directors from Rome
Spaghetti Western directors
Giallo film directors
Poliziotteschi directors